The 2022–23 Illawarra Hawks season was the 45th season of the franchise in the National Basketball League (NBL), and their first under the leadership of their new head coach Jacob Jackomas.

Roster

Standings

Ladder 

The NBL tie-breaker system as outlined in the NBL Rules and Regulations states that in the case of an identical win–loss record, the overall points percentage will determine order of seeding.

Ladder progression

Game log

Pre-season 

|-style="background:#FFBBBB;"
| 1
| 3 September
| UC Riverside Highlanders
| L 87–94
| Tyler Harvey (24)
| Sam Froling (7)
| Harvey, Robinson (3)
| Snakepit1,500
| 0–1
|-style="background:#FFBBBB;"
| 2
| 10 September 
| @ New Zealand
| L 71–68 (OT)
| Justin Robinson (26)
| Deng Deng (15)
| Sam Froling (3)
| The Stockyard600
| 0–2

NBL Blitz 

|-style="background:#BBF3BB;"
| 1
| 18 September
| Melbourne
| W 81–68
| Froling, Robinson (14)
| Sam Froling (8)
| Justin Robinson (8)
| Darwin Basketball Facility922
| 1–0
|-style="background:#BBF3BB;"
| 2
| 20 September
| @ New Zealand
| W 81–85
| Tyler Harvey (27)
| Sam Froling (7)
| Justin Robinson (8)
| Darwin Basketball Facility660
| 2–0
|-style="background:#FFBBBB;"
| 3
| 22 September
| Adelaide
| L 77–84
| George King (20)
| Deng, King (8)
| Harvey, White (4)
| Darwin Basketball Facility912
| 2–1

Regular season 

|-style="background:#FFBBBB;"
| 1
| 1 October
| Sydney
| L 97–106
| Lachlan Dent (19)
| Sam Froling (10)
| Justin Robinson (8)
| WIN Entertainment Centre4,008
| 0–1
|-style="background:#BBF3BB;"
| 2
| 6 October
| S.E. Melbourne
| W 85–72
| Tyler Harvey (22)
| Sam Froling (9)
| Lachlan Dent (5)
| WIN Entertainment Centre2,806
| 1–1
|-style="background:#FFBBBB;"
| 3
| 8 October
| @ Perth
| L 77–71
| George King (25)
| Deng Deng (12)
| Tyler Harvey (5)
| RAC Arena10,816
| 1–2
|-style="background:#FFBBBB;"
| 4
| 15 October
| @ Adelaide
| L 90–80
| Deng Deng (18)
| George King (9)
| Deng, Dent, Harvey (3)
| Adelaide Entertainment Centre8,143
| 1–3
|-style="background:#FFBBBB;"
| 5
| 17 October
| New Zealand
| L 62–88
| Tyler Harvey (12)
| George King (8)
| Lachlan Dent (4)
| WIN Entertainment Centre2,208
| 1–4
|-style="background:#FFBBBB;"
| 6
| 24 October
| Brisbane
| L 56–82
| Tyler Harvey (13)
| Dent, Froling, Mathiang (6)
| Lachlan Dent (4)
| WIN Entertainment Centre2,011
| 1–5
|-style="background:#FFBBBB;"
| 7
| 27 October
| @ Brisbane
| L 86–61
| Deng Deng (11)
| Sam Froling (12)
| Peyton Siva (5)
| Nissan Arena2,583
| 1–6
|-style="background:#FFBBBB;"
| 8
| 29 October
| Melbourne
| L 100–106 (2OT)
| Sam Froling (27)
| Sam Froling (15)
| Peyton Siva (11)
| WIN Entertainment Centre3,139
| 1–7

|-style="background:#FFBBBB;"
| 9
| 3 November 
| Adelaide 
| L 80–96
| Tyler Harvey (25)
| Sam Froling (11)
| Peyton Siva (10)
| WIN Entertainment Centre2,118
| 1–8
|-style="background:#FFBBBB;"
| 10
| 20 November 
| @ Sydney
| L 83–82
| Tyler Harvey (32)
| Deng Deng (9)
| Dent, Froling, Hickey (3)
| Qudos Bank Arena11,032
| 1–9
|-style="background:#FFBBBB;"
| 11
| 27 November 
| @ S.E. Melbourne
| L 112–78
| Frazier, Harvey (17)
| Sam Froling (7)
| Harvey, Siva (3)
| John Cain Arena5,099
| 1–10

|-style="background:#BBF3BB;"
| 12
| 5 December 
| Melbourne
| W 93–79
| Sam Froling (29)
| Deng, Froling (9)
| Siva (7)
| WIN Entertainment Centre2,248
| 2–10
|-style="background:#FFBBBB;"
| 13
| 8 December 
| @ S.E. Melbourne
| L 111–72
| Michael Frazier II (20)
| Mangok Mathiang (6)
| Peyton Siva (3)
| John Cain Arena2,918
| 2–11
|-style="background:#FFBBBB;"
| 14
| 10 December 
| @ Cairns
| L 102–101 (2OT)
| Michael Frazier II (26)
| Deng Deng (13)
| Peyton Siva (8)
| Cairns Convention Centre3,607
| 2–12
|-style="background:#FFBBBB;"
| 15
| 16 December 
| Sydney
| L 79–86
| Tyler Harvey (19)
| Mangok Mathiang (8)
| Peyton Siva (6)
| WIN Entertainment Centre3,288
| 2–13
|-style="background:#FFBBBB;"
| 16
| 18 December 
| @ Melbourne
| L 88–77
| Michael Frazier II (27)
| Deng, Froling, Harvey (6)
| Peyton Siva (4)
| John Cain Arena6,806
| 2–14
|-style="background:#FFBBBB;"
| 17
| 22 December 
| @ Tasmania
| L 87–60
| Sam Froling (19)
| Sam Froling (8)
| Peyton Siva (9)
| MyState Bank Arena4,269
| 2–15
|-style="background:#FFBBBB;"
| 18
| 31 December 
| Perth
| L 97–107
| Tyler Harvey (28)
| Sam Froling (13)
| Froling, Siva (3)
| WIN Entertainment Centre3,776
| 2–16

|-style="background:#FFBBBB;"
| 19
| 2 January 
| Cairns
| L 89–96
| Sam Froling (25)
| Sam Froling (13)
| Sam Froling (5)
| WIN Entertainment Centre2,718
| 2–17
|-style="background:#FFBBBB;"
| 20
| 6 January 
| @ Adelaide
| L 103–95
| Tyler Harvey (22)
| Sam Froling (10)
| Deng Deng (3)
| Adelaide Entertainment Centre9,308
| 2–18
|-style="background:#FFBBBB;"
| 21
| 10 January 
| Tasmania
| L 89–92
| Tyler Harvey (22)
| Sam Froling (8)
| Sam Froling (8)
| WIN Entertainment Centre2,846
| 2–19
|-style="background:#FFBBBB;"
| 22
| 13 January 
| @ Cairns
| L 89–84
| Tyler Harvey (25)
| Deng, Mathiang (8)
| Tyler Harvey (5)
| Cairns Convention Centre4,063
| 2–20
|-style="background:#FFBBBB;;"
| 23
| 15 January 
| @ Sydney
| L 84–79
| Tyler Harvey (24)
| Deng, Froling (9)
| Sam Froling (5)
| Qudos Bank Arena12,986
| 2–21
|-style="background:#BBF3BB;"
| 24
| 19 January 
| @ New Zealand
| W 76–78
| Tyler Harvey (25)
| Daniel Grida (7)
| Will Hickey (4)
| Spark Arena3,967
| 3–21
|-style="background:#FFBBBB;"
| 25
| 21 January 
| Brisbane
| L 86–103
| Tyler Harvey (22)
| Deng, Mathiang (6)
| Dent, Froling (3)
| WIN Entertainment Centre3,503
| 3–22
|-style="background:#FFBBBB;"
| 26
| 27 January 
| @ Perth
| L 106–86
| Tyler Harvey (23)
| Sam Froling (10)
| Will Hickey (5)
| RAC Arena12,521
| 3–23

|-style="background:#FFBBBB;"
| 27
| 2 February 
| New Zealand
| L 81–91
| Tyler Harvey (22)
| Froling, Gak, Hickey (6)
| Sam Froling (5)
| WIN Entertainment Centre2,039
| 3–24
|-style="background:#FFBBBB;"
| 28
| 4 February 
| Tasmania
| L 63–87
| Tyler Harvey (13)
| Froling, Grida (7)
| Lachlan Dent (2)
| WIN Entertainment Centre3,511
| 3–25

Transactions

Re-signed

Additions

Subtractions

Awards

Club awards 
 Community Award: Daniel Grida
 Defensive Player: Wani Swaka Lo Buluk
 Members Award: Tyler Harvey
 Club Person of the Year: Alex Moore
 Volunteer of the Year: Carl Stanbridge
 Player's Player Award: Akoldah Gak
 Club MVP: Sam Froling

See also 
 2022–23 NBL season
 Illawarra Hawks

References

External links 

 Official Website

Illawarra Hawks
Illawarra Hawks seasons
Illawarra Hawks season